The Mark 143 Armored Box Launcher (ABL) is a four-round protected launch container for the BGM-109 Tomahawk Cruise Missile.

Fitted to the  following their 1980s recommissioning upgrade, each ABL contains four ready-to-fire Tomahawks. The use of ABLs on these vessels rather than a non-armored solution was necessitated to enable the battleships to continue to exploit the capability provided by their heavy armor and reduce the vulnerability of the delicate missiles within. Eight ABLs were fitted to each of the four recommissioned battleships, providing 32 weapons to each ship. Some of the original dual 5 inch (127 mm) gun mounts were removed to fit the ABLs.

The cruisers and destroyers were fitted with two ABLs each for a total of 8 missiles.

Since then the Armored Box Launcher missile system has been phased out in favor of the more flexible, larger capacity Vertical Launching System (VLS). 

The Armored Box Launcher shares one common handicap with the Vertical Launching System: It can not be reloaded at sea. The ship must return to port in order to receive and load her ABLs.

Naval weapons of the United States